Ejnar Emborg   (1888–1963) was a Danish composer.

See also
List of Danish composers

References
This article was initially translated from the Danish Wikipedia.

Danish composers
Male composers
1888 births
1963 deaths
20th-century male musicians